The Ganges Barrage, officially named as the Lav Khush Barrage, this bridge across the Ganges river lies at Azad Nagar-Nawabganj in Kanpur.

The construction started in 1995 and it was inaugurated in May 2000. The total length is 621 m and the bridge serves as a four lane Highway Bypass for NH 91.

Proposed developments

Botanical Garden
The layout plan of Lohia Botanical Garden, prepared by a Delhi-based architect, was approved by the Kanpur Development Authority in 2014. There would be other attractions for entertainment and resources to improve the knowledge of children. There would be a cinema house and an artificial lake. Water museum would be another attraction while trees would illuminate in the evening. For cultural programme a well equipped platform is also proposed. There would be a shopping-cum-kid museum block, food court, game, entertainment zone and provision of two banquet halls.

Amusement park
The Kanpur Development Authority has planned to develop an amusement park in the city near Ganga Barrage. On the lines of Delhi Daat, it is also planning to develop a 'haat' inside the park where only handicraft items would be sold. The park will consist of open-air amphitheatre, drive-in cinema, swings for kids, lake for boating and cafeteria etc.

Trans Ganga city
The Trans Ganga City project, propped as a modern and clean-green city, would be developed by Uttar Pradesh State Industrial Development Corporation. Under the project, along with industrial and residential areas, commercial and institutional areas would be developed. A housing society comprising exhibition centre, multiplex, mega mall and multi-storied residential complexes are proposed. The industries in the enclave would be pollution free and it would be zero discharge area, so that it does not cause adverse impact on the ecology and Ganga river.

Kanpur-Lucknow high speed train
The high speed train is proposed between Ganga Barrage and Lucknow which will give relief for daily commuters between two cities.

Kanpur-Lucknow expressway
The new expressway between Kanpur and Lucknow will be started from Ganga Barrage. It would be eight lane access controlled expressway.

Panoramic view

Events
There have been cases of people committing suicide by jumping off the Barrage bridge.

References

Buildings and structures in Kanpur
Barrages in India
Weirs
Dams in Uttar Pradesh
Bridges over the Ganges
Dams completed in 2000
2000 establishments in Uttar Pradesh
Transport in Kanpur